The Galloway Community Hospital is a small hospital in Stranraer, Galloway, Scotland. It is managed by NHS Dumfries and Galloway.

History
The hospital was commissioned to replace the Garrick and Dalrymple hospitals in Stranraer and is located on the site of part of the Dalrymple hospital, adjacent to the Waverley Medical Centre. It opened on a partial basis in September 2006, with the renal unit opening in April 2007.

Services
Services provided at the hospital include accident and emergency. It has stage 1 accreditation as baby friendly.

References

External links
 

Hospital buildings completed in 2007
NHS Scotland hospitals
Stranraer
NHS Dumfries and Galloway
2006 establishments in Scotland
Hospitals in Dumfries and Galloway